Jalwa-e-Janan (Urdu: جلوۂ جاناں) was the first religious and spiritual album released by former Pakistani pop singer, Junaid Jamshed.
Its most popular naat is 'Muhammad Ka Roza Qareeb Aaraha Hai, Bulandi Pe Apna Naseeb Aaraha Hai'.

Track list
Jalwa-E-Janaan Intro 
Jagah Ji Lagane Ki (Poetry by Aziz al-Hasan Ghouri)
Jalwa-E-Janaan
Muhammad Ka Roza
Yeh Subhe Madina
Madad ae Mere
Multazim Par Dua (Poetry by Muhammad Taqi Usmani)
Tu Ne Poochhi Hai (Poetry by Allama Iqbal)
Surah Al Muminoon
Jalwa-E-Jaanan  
Rasha Makawa (Pashto)

External links
Listen Jalwa-e-Janan online
Download in MP3 Format

See also
Badr-ud-Duja

References

Junaid Jamshed albums
2005 albums
Islamic music
Islamic poetry